This is a list of films about renewable and alternative energy.

 Carbon Nation
 Catching the Sun
 The Fourth Revolution: Energy
 Fuel
 Gashole
 Gasland
 Generation on the Wind
 Go Further
 An Inconvenient Truth
 Lovins on the Soft Path
 Planet of the Humans
 Powerful: Energy for Everyone
 Race the Sun
 Switch Energy Project
 Wind Over Water
 Windfall

See also
 List of books about renewable energy

Films
Films